Pollan may refer to:

Pollan (fish), or Irish pollan
Carolyn Pollan, American politician
Carlos Pollán, Spanish handball player and politician
Michael Pollan, American author
Tracy Pollan, American actress

See also
Polan (disambiguation)
Polian (disambiguation)